A Funky Situation is a studio album by Wilson Pickett, released in 1978.

Production
The album was recorded in Muscle Shoals, Alabama. It was produced by Rick Hall. The horn arrangements were by Harrison Calloway, Jr.

Critical reception
The New Rolling Stone Record Guide wrote that the album "manages to update the tracks—including the inspired 'Lay Me Like You Hate Me', a summation of Pickett's philosophy of romance—without losing the singer's distinctive style." The Bay State Banner deemed it a " dirty-old-man-at-the-disco album." The Globe and Mail called it "an excellent wild dancing album."

Track listing
"Dance with Me" (Harrison Calloway)
"She's So Tight" (Rita Grimm, Yvonne Norman)
"The Night we Called it a Day" (Charles Feldman, John Grazier)
"Dance You Down" (Al Cartee, Ava Alderidge)
"Hold On to Your Hinie" (Tony Joe White)
"Groovin'" (Eddie Brigati, Felix Cavaliere)
"Lay Me Like You Hate Me" (Wilson Pickett)
"Funky Situation" (Curtis Wilkins)
"Time to Let The Sun Shine On Me" (Wilson Pickett)
"Who Turned You On" (Curtis Wilkins)

Personnel
Wilson Pickett - vocals
Randy McCormick - keyboards
Ken Bell, Larry Byrom - guitar
Bob Wray - bass
Roger Clark, Roger Hawkins (track 9) - drums
Mickey Buckins - percussion
Charles Chalmers, Donna Rhodes, Sandra Rhodes, Ava Aldridge, Cindy Richardson, Suzy Storm - backing vocals
Muscle Shoals Horns - horns
Harrison Calloway - horn arrangements
Technical
Lynn Dreese Breslin - albums design
Jim Houghton - cover photography

References

1978 albums
Wilson Pickett albums
Atlantic Records albums